Kelly Parker (born 8 March 1981) is a Canadian former soccer midfielder who last played for Atlanta Beat in Women's Professional Soccer. She was also a member of the Canadian national team from 2003 to 2012.

Career
Prior to joining SC Freiburg, Parker played for Sky Blue FC of Women's Professional Soccer, UTEP Miners, Ottawa Fury and F.C. Indiana.

Parker played for W-League winners Buffalo Flash in 2010 and was named MVP after scoring 11 goals in seven games. This was the second time she had won the award, having done so with Ottawa Fury in 2004. She is the only player to have won the award twice. In August 2010 Parker returned to Sky Blue FC, where she had played in 2009. Parker played her last professional season in 2011 with the Western New York Flash and the Atlanta Beat.

International career
Parker was a member of the Canada women's national soccer team from 2003 to 2012. She won the bronze medal with Canada in the 2012 Olympics when they defeated France 1–0 on 9 August 2012.

References

External links
 
 

1981 births
Living people
UTEP Miners women's soccer players
Women's association football midfielders
NJ/NY Gotham FC players
SC Freiburg (women) players
Western New York Flash players
Atlanta Beat (WPS) players
2011 FIFA Women's World Cup players
Footballers at the 2011 Pan American Games
Footballers at the 2012 Summer Olympics
Olympic soccer players of Canada
Olympic medalists in football
Olympic bronze medalists for Canada
Canada women's international soccer players
Canadian women's soccer players
Medalists at the 2012 Summer Olympics
Soccer people from Saskatchewan
Sportspeople from Regina, Saskatchewan
Pan American Games gold medalists for Canada
Canadian expatriate sportspeople in Germany
Pan American Games medalists in football
F.C. Indiana players
Expatriate women's footballers in Germany
Medalists at the 2011 Pan American Games
Women's Professional Soccer players
21st-century Canadian women
Ottawa Fury (women) players
USL W-League (1995–2015) players